Nærøysund is a municipality in Trøndelag county, Norway. It is located in the traditional district of Namdalen. The municipality was established on 1 January 2020 after the merger of the old municipalities of Vikna and Nærøy. The municipality is unique in that it has two equal administrative centre: Kolvereid and Rørvik. The other main population centres of Nærøysund include Abelvær, Foldereid, Gravvik, Ottersøy, Salsbruket, Steine, Torstad, Austafjord, Garstad, and Valøya.

The  municipality is the 70th largest by area out of the 356 municipalities in Norway. Nærøysund is the 114th most populous municipality in Norway with a population of 9,732.

General information

Municipal history
The municipality was established on 1 January 2020 when the neighboring municipalities of Nærøy and Vikna were merged. The small Lund area of Nærøy was not part of the merger, it instead was merged with the large Namsos Municipality to the south on the same date. The merger came about because on 8 June 2017, the Norwegian Parliament, the Storting, voted to merge the municipalities of Leka, Vikna, Nærøy, and Bindal to form one, large municipality effective 1 January 2020. Leka and Bindal municipalities rejected the merger, but Vikna and Nærøy agreed to the merger so it was carried out in 2020.

Name
The municipality is named after the Nærøysundet strait which is located in the municipality. The strait is named after the nearby island Nærøya. The first element is maybe the stem form of the name of the Norse god Njord (but it is suspicious that it is not in the genitive case).

Coat of arms
The coat of arms was approved for use starting on 1 January 2020. The blazon is "Argent, two bars wavy intertwined vert and azure". This means the arms have a field (background) that has a tincture of argent which means it is commonly colored white, but if it is made out of metal, then silver is used. The charge is two intertwined stripes, one green and one blue. The green symbolizes the land and agriculture while the blue symbolizes the sea and fishing industry. Both are intertwined like a rope to symbolize unity and the two old municipalities becoming one. The municipal flag has the same design as the coat of arms.

Churches
The Church of Norway had two parishes within the municipality of Nærøysund. It is part of the Namdal prosti (deanery) in the Diocese of Nidaros.

Government
All municipalities in Norway, including Nærøysund, are responsible for primary education (through 10th grade), outpatient health services, senior citizen services, unemployment and other social services, zoning, economic development, and municipal roads. The municipality is governed by a municipal council of elected representatives, which in turn elects a mayor. The municipality falls under the Namdal District Court and the Frostating Court of Appeal.

Municipal council
The municipal council  of Nærøysund is made up of 37 representatives that are elected to four year terms. The party breakdown of the council is as follows:

Mayors
The mayors of Nærøysund:

2019-present: Amund Hellesø (Ap)

Geography and climate 

Nærøysund is named after the strait between the islands Inner-Vikna, Marøya, Nærøya and the mainland. This has been an important strait for sea travel along the coast at least since the Viking age. The western part of the municipality consist of an archipelago with almost 6,000 islands and islets going west into the Norwegian Sea, with many straits between the islands. There are three main islands, Inner-Vikna, Mellom-Vikna and Ytter-Vikna, which all three are connected to the mainland by bridges. The largest town Rørvik, with the main harbor, is situated on Inner-Vikna facing the mainland. The mainland part of the municipality is more rugged, with mountains up to 873 meter ASL, but also of some lowland areas around the town Kolvereid.

Coastal areas in Nærøysund has an oceanic climate (Cfb) as autumn and winter are the wettest seasons, even if the winter temperature is close to a humid continental climate. There are two official weather stations recording temperature in the municipality, one at Rørvik Airport at Inner-Vikna island, the other at Nordøyan lighthouse further southwest on a smaller island. Nordøyan is warmer in winter with coldest monthly mean , but is cooler in summer compared to Rørvik. The all-time low at Rørvik Airport was recorded in January 2010, and the all-time high  was recorded July 27, 2019.

Notable people 

 Jens Schanche (1717 in Ytter-Vikna – 1787) a Norwegian postmaster and postal inspector
 Georg Sverdrup (1770 in Laugen – 1850) a statesman, a president of the Norwegian Constituent Assembly in Eidsvoll
 Jacob Liv Borch Sverdrup (1775 in Laugen – 1841) a Norwegian educator and farmer
 James M. Wahl (1846 at Storvahl - 1939) a pioneer Norwegian American settler in South Dakota
 Axel Collett (1880 in Kolvereid – 1968) a landowner, timber merchant and sawmill owner
 Magnhild Haalke (1885 in Vikna – 1984) a Norwegian novelist
 Ivar Skjånes (1888 in Kolvereid – 1975) politician, Mayor of Trondheim and County Governor of Sør-Trøndelag 
 Birger Brandtzæg (1893 in Abelvær – 1971) a merchant and owner of a fishing station 
 Brita Collett Paus (1917 in Salsbruket – 1998) a humanitarian and the founder of Fransiskushjelpen
 Paal Bog (born 1919 in Nærøy - 2002) an economist, civil servant, diplomat and Chairman of UNICEF
 Gullow Gjeseth (1937 in Nærøy – 2017) a military officer, commander of the land-based military forces
 Børre Rønningen (born 1949 in Vikna) a Norwegian politician, Mayor of Vikna 1999-2003
 Lars Peder Brekk (born 1955 in Vikna) a Norwegian businessman and politician
 Hilde Stavik (1962 in Kolvereid – 2015) a Norwegian long-distance runner

References

 
Nærøy
Vikna
Municipalities of Trøndelag
2020 establishments in Norway
Populated places established in 2020